The 2015 United Kingdom budget was delivered by George Osborne, the Chancellor of the Exchequer, to the House of Commons on Wednesday, 18 March 2015.

It was the sixth and final budget of the Conservative–Liberal Democrat coalition government formed after the 2010 general election, and also the sixth to be delivered by Osborne.

After the UK general election a second 2015 budget to be presented by Chancellor George Osborne was announced for 8 July 2015.

Taxes

Spending

Supply-side reform
Supply-side measures included digital infrastructure investment, transport, energy and environment and the sharing economy.

References

External links
2015 United Kingdom budget at Gov.uk
2015 United Kingdom Budget at the Guardian

United Kingdom
Budget
2015 03
March 2015 events in the United Kingdom
George Osborne